Görner is a surname. Notable people with the name include:

Karl August Görner (1806–1884), German actor, director and playwright
Karl Friedrich Görner, German organist
Johann Gottlieb Görner (1697–1778), German composer and organist
Johann Valentin Görner (1702 –1762), German composer
Hermann Görner (1891–1956), German strongman